Open Medicine was a peer-reviewed open-access medical journal established in April 2007 by former editors from the Canadian Medical Association Journal. In 2014, the editor-in-chief was Anita Palepu  from the University of British Columbia and the publisher was John Willinsky. The journal ceased publishing in November 2014, with the editors citing limited funding as among the reasons for the closure. The journal was abstracted and indexed in MEDLINE/PubMed. All content is archived on PubMed Central.

References

External links
Official website as it appeared in 2015, archived from the original http://www.openmedicine.ca

General medical journals
Publications established in 2007
English-language journals
Creative Commons Attribution-licensed journals
Quarterly journals
Publications disestablished in 2014
Defunct journals
Academic journals associated with learned and professional societies